A channel scan may refer to:
channel memory
channel surfing